Nidhauli Kalan is a town and a nagar panchayat in Sub District - Awagarh , Etah district in the Indian state of Uttar Pradesh.

Demographics
 India census, Nidhauli Kalan had a population of 7500. Males constitute 55% of the population and females 45%. Nidhauli Kalan has an average literacy rate of 48%, lower than the national average of 59.5%: male literacy is 55%, and female literacy is 40%. In Nidhauli Kalan, 17% of the population is under six years of age.

References

Cities and towns in Etah district

http://www.zhitm.org/index.html

3. http://www.punjabcolleges.com/68652-indiacolleges-Dr-ZH-Degree-College-Etah/

4. http://zhpgcollege.com/management.htm

5. http://wikimapia.org/9182736/Dr-ZH-Is
6. gahetu panchayat is business rose flower